Anderson Cardona (born June 7, 1988) is a professional male squash player who represents Colombia. He reached a career-high world ranking of World No. 246 in January 2013.

References

External links 

1988 births
Living people
Colombian male squash players
Sportspeople from Cali
Competitors at the 2013 World Games
21st-century Colombian people